Albinyana (official name in Catalan) or Albiñana  is a village in the province of Tarragona and the autonomous community of Catalonia, Spain. It belongs to Tarragona in the Baix Penedès region. According to data from 2009, its population was 2,275.

History
In the eleventh century, Viscount Guitard built his castle in Albinyana. His son Adalbert, who died during the Reconquista, bequeathed the place to the Monastery of San Cugat. In 1040, the abbot of the monastery ceded the lands to Bernat Otger on condition that he would rebuild the castle and take care of its defense. On being located in close proximity to the border and fearing Saracen attacks, the castle remained uninhabited for a long time. It belonged to the monks of Sant Cugat until the end of the lordships. There are no remains of the castle today although it is believed that it was located in the same place that today forms the center of the village.

There were also missing two other fortifications. One is the old Esquena Roja castle that is mentioned in documents from 1173. Shortly thereafter it became a farmhouse. The other fortification is the Tomoví castle, although documents found seem to suggest that it was more of a fortified mansion than a castle itself.

Historical buildings

The parish church was dedicated to St. Bartholomew. Although it appeared documented in 1120 as a possession of San Cugat, the current building is from the eighteenth century. It has a semicircular apse with frieze and window. The bell tower has a square base and is topped by the image of a little angel.

In Plaza Major there is another remarkable building: Cal Pau Magí. It is a seventeenth-century building with three floors. Inside there is a lobby covered with a vaulted arch and the stairs to the residential area where the date of construction (1637) is inscribed. It is the former residence of the San Cugat administrator.

In Les Peces there is a large building known as Cal Gener. It is a building of the fifteenth and sixteenth centuries, rebuilt in the eighteenth century. The windows are surrounded by stone and its façade presents some interesting sgraffiti restored in 1984. They represent human figures and various architectural and geometric elements. It operates as a house-museum dedicated to rural tourism.

The Sant Antoni hermitage is found on the outskirts of Albinyana. It is an eighteenth-century building with a rectangular floor plan and a gable roof. It has a barrel vault and exterior buttresses. It also has an attached tower that serves as a bell tower. It is believed that it was part of the defense structure of the old castle. It is located on a small hill and the entire structure is white.

Economy
The main economic activity is rainfed agriculture. The main crops are vineyards, grains, almond and hazelnut. Until the mid-twentieth century there was a major industry devoted to manufacturing palm baskets.

Local celebrations
The town celebrates its festivals in July, coinciding with the Virgen del Carmen, and on August 24, the feast of the San Bartolomé.

Photo gallery

References

External links
Information about the Municipality 
Photos and information about Cal gener 
 Government data pages 

Municipalities in Baix Penedès
Populated places in Baix Penedès